Masumiyeh (also Romanized as Ma‘şūmīyeh; also known as Shabeh and Shahveh) is a village in Masumiyeh Rural District, in the Central District of Arak County, Markazi Province, Iran. At the 2006 census, its population was 2,101, in 625 families.

References 

Populated places in Arak County